As was the custom since 1930, the 1955 Tour de France was contested by national and regional teams. Eight national teams were sent, with 10 cyclists each from France, Belgium, Spain, Great Britain, the Netherlands, Italy, Switzerland, and a mixed team consisting of Luxembourgian, Austrian, German and Australian cyclists. France additionally sent five regional teams from 10 cyclists each, divided into Center-North East France, West France, South East France, Île-de-France and South West France. In total, 130 cyclists started the race.

The mixed team included cyclists from West Germany, which was the first time since the Second World War that German cyclists were allowed to ride the Tour. The Great Britain team was the first British team in Tour history.

Louison Bobet, the winner of the 1953 Tour de France and the 1954 Tour de France, had done an aggressive preparation in the early season before the Tour de France, aiming for his third victory. Bobet was the main favourite, also because he was the world champion.

Start list

By team

By rider

By nationality

References

1955 Tour de France
1955